Arrowsmith is a 1931 American pre-Code drama film directed by John Ford and starring Ronald Colman, Helen Hayes, Richard Bennett, and Myrna Loy. It was adapted from Sinclair Lewis's 1925 novel Arrowsmith by Sidney Howard, departing substantially from the book regarding Arrowsmith's womanizing and other key plot elements. The pre-Code film received four Oscar nominations, including the Academy Award for Best Picture, Best Writing, Adaptation (Howard), Best Cinematography (Ray June), and Best Art Direction (Richard Day).

Plot
An idealistic young medical student, Martin Arrowsmith, introduces himself assertively to Dr. Max Gottlieb, a noted bacteriologist. Though Gottlieb deems Arrowsmith not yet ready to study with him, he is impressed by the young man's determination and honest self-appraisal, and encourages him to take the standard course of study first. When Arrowsmith graduates, Gottlieb offers him a position as his research assistant, but the young man reluctantly turns him down, having fallen in love with a nurse, Leora. He would be unable to support her on a research assistant's meager salary. He marries, and the couple sets off for Leora's rural home town in South Dakota.

Unhappy with the vicissitudes of his medical practice there, he is drawn by a former client across the boundary into veterinary medicine when the man's cows are dying - even faster when given injections by the local state health official.  Determined to find a cure of his own, he carries out scientific research in his kitchen, eventually developing a successful serum. Reinvigorated, he decides to abandon his practice and join Gottlieb as a research scientist at the renowned and extremely well-funded McGurk Institute in New York. Meanwhile, Leora miscarries and cannot have any more children, so she devotes herself to her husband's career.

After two fallow years at McGurk, Arrowsmith stumbles onto an antibiotic serum that he does not understand (and is unsure how he produced), yet has demonstrated the ability to kill at least one type of germ.  He shortly is able to replicate it, and in order to study its efficacy on other microbes is sent to the West Indies, where a virulent outbreak of bubonic plague has arisen.  He is coincidentally teamed with a popular Swedish lecturer on "Heroes of Health" he once met while still in South Dakota, Dr. Gustav Sondelius, who is extremely enthusiastic over both the team and the serum's prospects to help cure the disease. Leora accompanies her husband, despite his fear for her safety. 

Arrowsmith has strict instructions from Gottlieb to employ the scientific method in his efforts, conducting a blind study by administering the serum to one-half his patients and a placebo injection to the other.  Upon learning of this, the West Indies governor, Sir Robert Fairland, refuses to allow him to proceed.  Seeking to break the impasse, black Dr. Oliver Marchand suggests Arrowsmith conduct his experiment in a backwater community on a neighboring island where the infection is rampant. Arrowsmith agrees, insisting Leona stay behind for her own protection.  The study begins.  Among those seeking an inoculation of Arrowsmith's serum is Mrs. Joyce Lanyon, a New York socialite stranded on the island. They are attracted to each other, though their subsequent affair is only hinted at obliquely.

Sondelius contracts the disease.  In his death throes, he pleads with Arrowsmith to abandon scientific protocol and save as many lives as possible. Concerned about his wife's welfare, Arrowsmith asks Marchand to check on her upon his return to the main island, only to have his colleague die while on the phone before he can give his report.  Arrowsmith races home, but Leora is dead. In a drunken delirium, he gives the serum to all, saving the Indies from the plague. Upon his return to New York, he is hailed by the press and feted by McGurk Institute head Dr. Tubbs, who seeks to take advantage of Arrowsmith's glory. Arrowsmith instead rushes directly to Gottlieb.

Desperate to explain his abandonment of research principles and his mentor's specific mandate to advance science rather than practice medicine, Arrowsmith discovers that Gottlieb has had a stroke, is insensible, and near death.  Disgusted with all that is transpiring, friend and colleague Terry Wickett, a prominent chemist at the Institute, announces abruptly that he is quitting to set up his own "shoestring" laboratory to pursue science.  Turning his back on public adulation, a promotion, and a big raise, Arrowsmith resigns to join forces with Wickett. Joyce Lanyon appears, seeking to rekindle their relationship, but he spurns her, committing himself to his career.

Cast
Ronald Colman as Dr Martin Arrowsmith
Helen Hayes as Leora Arrowsmith
Richard Bennett as Gustav Sondelius
A.E. Anson as Professor Max Gottlieb
Clarence Brooks as Oliver Marchand
Alec B. Francis as Twyford
Claude King as Dr. Tubbs 
Bert Roach as Bert Tozer
Myrna Loy as Mrs Joyce Lanyon
Russell Hopton as Terry Wickett
David Landau as State Veterinarian
Lumsden Hare as Sir Robert Fairland – Governor
Ward Bond as Cop (uncredited)
John Qualen as Henry Novak (uncredited)

Production
The film is only somewhat faithful to the novel, among other significant changes omitting Arrowsmith's serial womanizing, and completely skipping all mention of Arrowsmith's wealthy, self-centered second wife. Myrna Loy has only a few scenes with Colman, and their relationship is undeveloped to the point of being indecipherable. According to Robert Osborne, host of Turner Classic Movies, Helen Hayes claimed that as filming went on various scenes were dropped from the script without explanation. It is claimed that Samuel Goldwyn had hired director John Ford on condition that he not drink during the production. Allegedly Ford sped up filming at the expense of plot and continuity to get to a bottle.

Reaction
The film was a financial and critical success. It was nominated for four Academy Awards, including for Best Picture, Best Writing, Adaptation (Howard), Best Art Direction (Richard Day) and Best Cinematography (Ray June).

References

External links
 
 
 Tom Paulus, "The View Across the Courtyard: Bazin and the Evolution of Depth Style" in the Andre Bazin special issue, Jeffrey Crouse (ed.), Film International, Issue 30, Vol. 5, No. 6, 2007, pp. 62–73.

1931 films
1931 drama films
American drama films
American black-and-white films
Films scored by Alfred Newman
Films based on American novels
Films based on works by Sinclair Lewis
Films directed by John Ford
Films set in the Caribbean
Samuel Goldwyn Productions films
1930s English-language films
1930s American films